The 1971 Princeton Tigers football team was an American football team that represented Princeton University during the 1971 NCAA University Division football season. Princeton tied for fifth in the Ivy League.

In their first year under head coach Jake McCandless, the Tigers compiled a 4–5 record but outscored opponents 195 to 160. Robert Wolfe was the team captain.

Princeton's 3–4 conference record tied for fifth in the Ivy League standings. The Tigers outscored Ivy opponents 142 to 115. 

Princeton played its home games at Palmer Stadium on the university campus in Princeton, New Jersey.

Schedule

References

Princeton
Princeton Tigers football seasons
Princeton Tigers football